Povolny or Povolný (Czech feminine: Povolná) is a surname. Notable people include:

 César Povolny (1914–unknown), French footballer
  (1924–2004), Czech biologist
 37141 Povolný, minor planet named after him
 Mojmír Povolný (1921–2012), Czech lawyer and politician

See also
 
 Powolny

Czech-language surnames